Kifle is both a surname and a given name. Notable people with the name include:

Elias Kifle, Ethiopian journalist and activist
Goitom Kifle, Eritrean athlete
Yonas Kifle (born 1977), Eritrean long-distance runner
Kifle Wodajo (1936–2004), Ethiopian politician

See also
Kifli